The Gyeonggi Provincial Office of Education is the office of education for Gyeonggi Province, South Korea. The current superintendent is Lee Jae-jeong. It was established in 1956.

Superintendent 
The current superintendent is Lee Jae-jeong. He took office in 2018 August.

Private School Purchase Programs 
The department had a program where private schools in financial distress are bought by the department, with the schools becoming public after changes in administration. The department bought 9 such kindergartens in August 2019, to open in March 2020.

References 

Schools in South Korea